HLA-B13 (B13) is an HLA-B serotype. The serotype identifies the more common HLA-B*13 gene products. (For terminology help see: HLA-serotype tutorial)

Serotype

Allele frequencies

References

1